Miles of Plancy (died 1174), also known as Milon or Milo, was a noble in the crusader Kingdom of Jerusalem.

He was born in Plancy-l'Abbaye, Champagne and came to the east in the 1160s, where he served King Amalric I, to whom he was distantly related. Amalric made him seneschal of Jerusalem, and in 1167 he participated in Amalric's expedition to Egypt. He encouraged Amalric to make a treaty with Egypt rather than capturing it by force and submitting it to plunder; after Amalric returned home, Egypt quickly fell under the control of Nur ad-Din Zangi and his commander Shirkuh. This event would eventually lead to the union of Egypt and Syria under Saladin, an inauspicious outcome for the crusader kingdom.

In 1170 a fortress was built at Gaza by the Knights Templar, to defend against attacks from Egypt. Miles would not allow the unarmed inhabitants of the city to take shelter inside and many of them were killed when the city was attacked. In 1173 he married Stephanie of Milly, daughter of Philip of Milly and widow of Humphrey III of Toron. Through his marriage to Stephanie, he became lord of the castle of Montréal and Lord of Oultrejordain. The inheritance of Montréal was, however, to prove controversial: Stephanie had gained it on the death of her young niece, Beatrice Brisebarre. Beatrice's father, Walter III Brisebarre, had previously been forced to exchange his lordship of Beirut for a money fief; he was compensated for his sister-in-law's inheritance of Montréal with the much-inferior fief of Blanchegarde. The resentment of the Brisebarres may have been a significant factor in Miles's eventual murder.

In 1174 Amalric died and Miles acted as an unofficial regent for his son and successor Baldwin IV, who, although stricken with leprosy, was crowned king in his own right. The chronicler William of Tyre did not like him, calling him "a brawler and a slanderer, ever active in stirring up trouble", and Miles insulted the other barons of the kingdom, especially those who were native easterners, by refusing to consult them on any matter. Count Raymond III of Tripoli came to Jerusalem and claimed the regency as Baldwin's nearest male relative. Raymond was supported by the other powerful native barons, including the king's stepfather Reginald of Sidon, Humphrey II of Toron (grandfather of Miles' stepson), and the brothers Baldwin of Ibelin and Balian of Ibelin.

In October 1174, Miles was assassinated in Acre. The Regni Iherosolymitani Brevis Historia in the Annals of Genoa blamed the killing on Walter III Brisebarre, former lord of Beirut, and his brother Guy. As noted above, Walter had been married to Helena of Milly, older sister of Miles's wife Stephanie, and it is may be that the murder was a result of the private family feud over the fief of Montréal. It is also possible, as William of Tyre hinted, that the Brisebarre brothers, already aggrieved, had been further incited by Miles's political opponents. There is no direct evidence that Raymond was involved, but he was certainly the chief beneficiary. William of Tyre also reported that the assassination occurred because Miles was so fiercely loyal to Baldwin IV: he had refused to grant away crown lands.

Within days, the Haute Cour officially designated Raymond regent. Stephanie married Raynald of Châtillon, the widower of Constance of Antioch, in 1176.

Sources
 Bernard Hamilton, "Miles of Plancy and the fief of Beirut", in Benjamin Z. Kedar (ed.), The Horns of Hattin (Jerusalem, 1992), pp. 136–46.
 Bernard Hamilton, The Leper King and His Heirs (Cambridge, 2000)

1174 deaths
Lords of Oultrejordain
Christians of the Crusades
Assassinated nobility
Year of birth unknown